CNN Tonight is a title that has been used by multiple news programs broadcast by the U.S. cable news channel CNN. The title has primarily been used for transitional programs aired by CNN in the evening and prime time hours as part of changes to its programming lineup—including the departure (either voluntary or via termination) or reassignment of anchors. The majority of programs aired under the title have been anchored by a rotation of CNN personalities.

The title was first used for a short-lived program in 2001 anchored by Bill Hemmer. In November 2009, CNN Tonight temporarily replaced Lou Dobbs Tonight after Lou Dobbs' departure from the network. In April 2014, a third iteration of CNN Tonight premiered as a 10 p.m. ET program, as part of schedule changes following the cancellation of Piers Morgan Live; this iteration would later become a full-time program hosted by Don Lemon, and was renamed Don Lemon Tonight in May 2021.

In December 2021, the title was reinstated in the 9 p.m. hour as a replacement for Cuomo Prime Time (which is produced by that program's staff), after Chris Cuomo was fired from the network over allegations and evidence of sexual misconduct. Don Lemon departed his program in October 2022 to move to CNN's upcoming morning show; on October 10, ahead of the 2022 midterm elections, Jake Tapper became an interim host of the 9 p.m. hour, and Don Lemon Tonight was replaced with hours of CNN Tonight hosted by Alisyn Camerota and Laura Coates.

In late-February 2023, CNN began to experiment with a rotation of various special reports and interviews in the 9 p.m. hour under the title CNN Primetime.

History

As a transitional replacement for Lou Dobbs Tonight 
On November 11, 2009, Lou Dobbs abruptly announced his departure from CNN and Lou Dobbs Tonight to "pursue new opportunities". His departure came amid growing controversy over his promotion of Barack Obama citizenship conspiracy theories. CNN announced that Lou Dobbs Tonight would be replaced in the 7:00 p.m. ET hour by CNN Tonight, an interim program hosted by a rotation of anchors (which would include John Roberts, Erica Hill, and Tom Foreman), until the premiere of a new program hosted by CNN's chief national correspondent John King. 

CNN Tonight ran until January 18, 2010, when the premiere of Rick's List resulted in The Situation Room being moved up into its timeslot. Its permanent replacement John King, USA, premiered on March 22, 2010.

As a transitional program in 2014 

On April 10, 2014, after the cancellation of Piers Morgan Live, CNN announced that it would begin to air CNN original series and documentaries in the 9:00 p.m. ET hour to replace Piers Morgan (as part of a larger push towards factual and reality content by new CNN head Jeff Zucker), and premiere the new program CNN Tonight at 10:00 p.m., which would feature "a live hour of the day’s biggest stories". The hour had most recently been used for sporadic broadcasts of the Anderson Cooper 360° spin-off AC360° Later, pilot episodes of The Don Lemon Show, and special coverage of the disappearance of Malaysia Airlines Flight 370 hosted by Don Lemon. 

CNN Tonight premiered on April 15, 2014, with Bill Weir anchoring from Boston to cover the one-year anniversary of the Boston Marathon bombing. It returned to CNN's studio the following night, with Weir presenting the program from the set formerly used by Piers Morgan Live (albeit using a store-bought office desk placed off to the side from its main desk and interview area). Don Lemon later became the permanent host of the hour, after which it evolved from a straight newscast to a personality-based program similar to CNN's other prime time shows.

On May 14, 2021, Lemon announced during that night's episode that it would be "the last night that we'll be CNN Tonight with Don Lemon", and teased a major change to the program on May 17. The following day, amid speculation by viewers that he was leaving CNN, Lemon posted a video on social media to clarify the tease, announcing that CNN Tonight was being renamed Don Lemon Tonight beginning May 17. He apologized for the confusion, saying that he "didn't mean to set the internet on fire".

As a transitional replacement for Cuomo Prime Time and Don Lemon Tonight 
On December 1, 2021, CNN received allegations and documentary evidence that Chris Cuomo—who had already been suspended indefinitely following reports that he assisted in the defense against the sexual harassment allegations that led to the resignation of his brother Andrew Cuomo as governor of New York—had engaged in sexual misconduct involving a former colleague, represented by attorney Debra Katz. She has since claimed that this allegation precipitated his firing from CNN. 

On December 6, his show Cuomo Prime Time was replaced with CNN Tonight; the program is produced by the Cuomo Prime Time staff and hosted by rotating anchors, with Michael Smerconish having hosted the first week of shows. As of June 2022, the program had largely remained in third place among cable news channels in the 9 p.m. hour, behind MSNBC Prime (a retooling of The Rachel Maddow Show similarly featuring rotating anchors, after Maddow moved to a weekly schedule in May 2022 to accommodate other projects) and Fox News Channel's Hannity.

On September 22, 2022, ahead of the midterm elections and Don Lemon's upcoming move to CNN This Morning, it was announced that Jake Tapper would vacate his afternoon show The Lead and temporarily host CNN Tonight at 9:00 p.m., while Alisyn Camerota and Laura Coates would share a 10 p.m. hour of CNN Tonight to replace Lemon. Don Lemon Tonight aired its final episode on October 7, 2022. The premiere of CNN Tonight with Jake Tapper on October 10 featured interviews with Joe Biden and Dwayne Johnson; while still finishing third overall, it did see an improvement in average viewership over the hour in September 2022, and that night's edition finished second behind MSNBC's Alex Wagner Tonight in the 25-54 demographic.

In January 2023, it was announced that Camerota and Coates would host the 10 and 11 p.m. hours of CNN Tonight respectively. On February 3, 2023, CNN began to air Overtime, the post-show segment of HBO's Real Time with Bill Maher, as part of the 11:00 p.m. hour of CNN Tonight on Friday nights. 

Later that month, it was reported that CNN planned to retool the 9:00 p.m. hour as CNN Primetime, which would feature a rotation of various formats such as special reports, town halls, and interviews. The new format was announced on February 27, and debuted on February 28 with an interview special between Jake Tapper and Bill Maher. The rest of the week featured specials with extended analysis on the trial of Alex Murdaugh hosted by Coates and a panel of legal experts, an interview between Arlette Saenz and First Lady Jill Biden, and Erin Burnett interviewing Alexei Navalny's daughter Dasha Navalnaya, and Navalny director Daniel Roher.

References

| rowspan="2" style="text-align:center;" |Preceded byAnderson Cooper 360º
| rowspan="2" style="text-align:center;" |CNN Tonight10:00 PM – 12:00 AM
| style="text-align:center;" |Succeeded byAnderson Cooper 360° (replay)(Following First Airing)
|-
| style="text-align:center;" |CNN Newsroom Live(Following Second Airing)
|-

2001 American television series debuts
2009 American television series debuts
2021 American television series debuts
2001 American television series endings
2010 American television series endings
2000s American television talk shows
2010s American television talk shows
2020s American television talk shows
CNN original programming
English-language television shows